Ambesse Tolosa (born 28 August 1977 in Shewa) is an Ethiopian long-distance runner, who specializes in the marathon race.

Tolosa tested positive for banned substances in February 2008 and received a two-year ban from competitive athletics. The substance that was present in his system (morphine) was not a performance-enhancing drug and Tolosa said that he did not know how it had gotten into his body, but the IAAF rules stated that athletes received bans regardless of intent. His results from 9 December 2007 onwards were annulled, which included his win at the Honolulu Marathon that year.

Achievements

Personal bests 

All information taken from IAAF profile.

References

External links

1977 births
Living people
Ethiopian male long-distance runners
Ethiopian male marathon runners
Athletes (track and field) at the 2004 Summer Olympics
Olympic athletes of Ethiopia
Ethiopian sportspeople in doping cases
Doping cases in athletics
Paris Marathon male winners
20th-century Ethiopian people
21st-century Ethiopian people